Damian Garbacik (born 30 January 1996) is a Polish professional footballer who plays as a defender for Bałtyk Gdynia.

Senior career

Garbacik started playing with the club in his town of birth, Granica Kętrzyn, in Kętrzyn. In 2013, he made the move to play with Lechia Gdańsk in the top flight of Polish football. However his time with Lechia was not successful, and he only made two appearances in the league. He joined Chojniczanka Chojnice on loan in 2015, before joining GKS Katowice at the end of the season when his contract with Lechia ran out. After a season and a half with Katowice, during which Garbacik also scored his first senior league goal, he was released before his contract was finished. 

After a 6-month spell without finding a new club, Garbacik signed with Bałtyk Gdynia during the 2018 pre-season. In January 2019, after moving down the leagues in Poland, Garbacik moved to the Norwegian lower leagues with Lysekloster IL, stating that he wanted to try a new challenge. While in Norway Garbacik was often in the starting eleven, and found himself to be scoring more than he had at any previous club. Despite the level of quality being lower than at his previous clubs, it proved to be a personally successful period for Garbacik scoring three league goals during his time at the club, including one in the Norwegian Cup. Garbacik spent the 2019 season with Lysekloster IL before returning to his previous club Bałtyk Gdynia in February 2020.

References

1996 births
Living people
Polish footballers
Lechia Gdańsk players
Lechia Gdańsk II players
Chojniczanka Chojnice players
GKS Katowice players
Bałtyk Gdynia players
Cartusia Kartuzy players
Ekstraklasa players
I liga players
III liga players
Association football defenders
Poland youth international footballers
Polish expatriate footballers
Polish expatriate sportspeople in Norway
Expatriate footballers in Norway